Branislav Spáčil (born 20 September 2003) is a Slovak footballer who plays for FC Petržalka as a right winger.

Club career
Spáčil made his professional Fortuna Liga debut for FC Nitra against FK Senica during a home 0:3 loss at pod Zoborom on 17 April 2001.

References

External links
 Futbalnet profile 
 
 

2003 births
Living people
Slovak footballers
Association football midfielders
FC Nitra players
FC Petržalka players
Slovak Super Liga players
2. Liga (Slovakia) players